Leinøya is an island in the municipality of Herøy in Møre og Romsdal county, Norway. Its original name was Bølandet, but Leinøya is now the official name. The island is located east of the town of Fosnavåg on the nearby island of Bergsøya.  The island is connected to several surrounding islands via a network of bridges.  The Remøy Bridge connects it to the island Remøya (to the north), the Herøy Bridge connects it to Nautøya and Gurskøya (to the south), and a small bridge connects to the island of Bergsøya (to the west).

The village of Torvik, on the east side of the island, is a stop on the Hurtigruten. In 2015, the island had 1,479 residents.

See also
List of islands of Norway

References

Islands of Møre og Romsdal
Herøy, Møre og Romsdal
Sunnmøre